The Church of St. George is a Greek Orthodox church within the Babylon Fortress in Coptic Cairo. It is part of the Holy Patriarchal Monastery of St George under the Greek Orthodox Patriarchate of Alexandria and all Africa.   The church dates back to the 10th century (or earlier). The current structure was rebuilt following a 1904 fire, construction was finished in 1909. Since 2009, the monastery's hegumen has had the rank of bishop with title Bishop Babylonos ("Bishop of Babylon").

References

External links
 Holy Monastery of St George Patriarchate of Alexandria

Old Cairo
Coptic Cairo
Churches in Cairo
Greek Orthodox churches
Greek Orthodoxy in Egypt
Eastern Orthodox churches in Egypt
Greek Orthodox Church of Alexandria
Church buildings with domes
10th-century establishments in the Fatimid Caliphate
Churches completed in 1909
10th-century churches in Egypt
20th-century Eastern Orthodox church buildings
20th-century churches in Egypt